Loch Tay is a freshwater loch in the central highlands of Scotland, in the Perth and Kinross and Stirling council areas. It is the largest body of fresh water in Perth and Kinross, and the sixth largest loch in Scotland. The watershed of Loch Tay traditionally formed the historic province of Breadalbane.

Pre-history and archaeology 
Between 1996 and 2005, a large scale project was carried out to investigate the heritage and archaeology of Loch Tay, the Ben Lawers Historic Landscape (BLHL) Project. It took place primarily on the National Trust for Scotland’s property but included some local landowners who held the agricultural lands between the head-dyke and the loch-shore.

Mesolithic period 
Before 1996 the earliest known evidence for occupation along the shores of Loch Tay had been a nearby stone-axe  factory at Creag an Caillich and the 1965 excavations of the stone circle at Croft  Moraig (dated to the 3rd-  to  2nd-millennium  BC). However, the BLHL project found a lithic scatter along the Ben Lawers Nature Trail that dated to the 8th and 7th millennia BC, during Scotland's Mesolithic period. This and another Mesolithic site found during the project were very important to archaeologists understanding of that time period in Scotland. Until the 1990s most Mesolithic sites were recorded along the coasts and these sites were the first ones recorded in the uplands of the Highlands, demonstrating that the hunter and gathers of that time did not strictly live by the coasts.

Neolithic and Bronze Ages 
The BLHL project also found evidence of people living and working in the hills above the loch during the Neolithic period. A Beaker burial was also found, the Balnahanaid Beaker, which may be among the earliest Beakers in Scotland, dating to a time when their use was rare.

Prehistoric environment and loch levels 
Investigations of the loch have found that a Neolithic woodland existed on its edge for at least 900 years and that during that period the shoreline would have been least 4–5m lower than it is today.

Iron Age 
Several of the 20 crannogs found along Loch Tay have been radiocarbon dated to the Iron Age:

 Morenish Crannog 50 BC – AD  220 
 Morenish Boathouse Crannog  750 BC – AD 30
 Milton Morenish Crannog 810 – 390 BC
 Eilean Breaban Crannog AD 420–640 & 600–400 BC (two occupations) 
 Tombreck Crannog 170BC–AD180

As well as round houses that were excavated at Croftvellich and Tombreck which the archeologists took to indicate that that settlements may have been much more densely concentrated during the Iron Age than was previously thought - people living both on the land and on the water.

Early Historic 
The Loch appears to have been at the edge of Pictland. An Early Christian graveyard at Balnahanaid was found, as well as some upland occupations sites. Furthermore, there is evidence that Eilean Breaban, Dall North and Craggan Crannogs were occupied during this period but overall Loch Tay was not a major centre of Pictish activity.

Medieval 
In the Early Medieval period people began to cultivate the higher elevations of the hills around the loch. The Macnabs, the Menzies, the Drummonds, the Napiers, the Haldanes, the MacGregors and the Robertsons of Carwhin and Strowan all owned land around the loch but little remains of their possible castles/manoors. Most of the surviving lordly residences are associated with the Glenorchy Campbells, who grew in power and influence during the 15th and early 16th centuries, specifically those at Lawers, Carwhin and Edramucky.

Post-medieval and modern 
The Campbells would hold most of the land in the area from around the 1600s to the late 1800s, when they began to sell off the land. Though before doing so they undertook clearances of the residents. It is estimated that two-thirds of the population was removed from around the loch. The National Trust for Scotland would buy a significant amount of the land in the 1950s to become the largest landowner in the area.

Scottish Crannog Centre 

More than 20 crannogs have been identified in Loch Tay. The Scottish Crannog Centre. is an open-air museum on the south of Loch Tay and has a reconstructed crannog, which was built between 1994 and 1997. The recreated Iron Age roundhouse was destroyed by fire in 2021. The museum is raising money for its repair.

Geography 
Killin at the head of the loch, and Kenmore at the outflow of the River Tay, are the main settlements on the lochside today.  The smaller settlements of Acharn, Ardeonaig and Ardtalnaig are located on the south side of the loch whilst Fearnan and Lawers are on the north side.  The loch is fed by the rivers Dochart and Lochay at its head and numerous smaller streams.

Railway 

Loch Tay railway station was on the Killin Railway. It is now closed.

In popular culture 
The loch is a popular spot for salmon fishing, and many of its surroundings feature in the traditional Scottish 'Loch Tay Boat Song' (Scottish Gaelic, Iorram Loch Tatha).  This is a very sad song in which the protagonist muses on unrequited love for a red-haired woman (a Nighean ruadh) whilst rowing at the end of a working day.  It has been recorded by Liam Clancy and The Corries amongst others.
The film monty python and the holy grail filmed the famous scene with the rabbit at tambershine mine on the south bank of the loch. It is a largely unknown/unacknowledged site. There is a couple plush bunny rabbits with red dye on their mouths left by fans.

References

External links

 Killin.info community website, guides, photos, media, news.
 YouTube.com video of Killin area featuring Loch Tay.
The Scottish Crannog Centre
some facts about Loch Tay and its history

Tay
Tay
LTay
Protected areas of Perth and Kinross